Cristina Torrens Valero was the defending champion, but lost in quarterfinals to Jennifer Hopkins.

Henrieta Nagyová won the title by defeating Amanda Hopmans 2–6, 6–4, 7–5 in the final.

Seeds

Draw

Finals

Top half

Bottom half

References
 Official Results Archive (ITF)
 Official Results Archive (WTA)

Warsaw Cup by Heros - Singles